Stephen Cabarrus (1754–1808) held the office of the Speaker of the House of Representatives in North Carolina from 1789 to 1793 and from 1800 to 1805.

Cabarrus County, North Carolina is named after him because, while serving as speaker, Cabarrus cast the deciding vote to create the new county in 1792.
Born in Bayonne, France, Cabarrus lived in Edenton, North Carolina, having emigrated in 1776.  His remains were interred in the churchyard of St. Paul's Episcopal Church at Edenton.

See also

 Francisco Cabarrus

References

Members of the North Carolina House of Representatives
People from Edenton, North Carolina
1754 births
1808 deaths
People from Bayonne
French emigrants to the Thirteen Colonies
18th-century American politicians
19th-century American politicians